The Zhumadian West Station is a railway station of Beijing–Guangzhou–Shenzhen–Hong Kong High-Speed Railway located in Zhumadian, Henan, People's Republic of China.

Railway stations in Henan
Stations on the Shijiazhuang–Wuhan High-Speed Railway
Railway stations in China opened in 2012